Sfera (helmet), Russian helmet
Sfera (geodesy satellite), Soviet satellite class of the 1960s and 70s
Sfera (satellite), passive satellite deployed from ISS in 2012
Sfera (satellite constellation), a project for a satellite group by the Russian Federation
Sfera (mall), Polish mall
SFera, Croatian science fiction group
SFERA Award
SFeraKon, conference by SFera
Sfera Stin Kardia, Greek music album
Sfera Politicii, Romanian magazine
Lazăr Sfera (1909–1992), Romanian footballer
Sfera con Sfera, Italian sculpture